Edward John Carnell (8 April 1912 – 23 March 1972) was a British science fiction editor known for editing New Worlds in 1946 then from 1949 to 1963. He also edited Science Fantasy from the 1950s. After the magazines were sold to another publisher he left to launch the New Writings in Science Fiction anthology series, editing 21 issues until his death, after which the series was continued by Kenneth Bulmer for a further 9 issues.

Taken together his publications played a role in starting the careers of Damien Broderick, Brian W. Aldiss, James White, J. G. Ballard, and his successor at New Worlds, Michael Moorcock. Despite that list, Carnell tended to prefer adventure and Hard SF to New Wave experimentation so John Christopher, Kenneth Bulmer, and E. C. Tubb were more typical of his tenure. However, he was not seen as an opponent of the New Wave in the way John W. Campbell tended to be, and he even published a number of more experimental works by such authors as J. G. Ballard and Brian Aldiss.

Anthologies
Jinn and Jitters (1946)
No Place Like Earth (1952, T. V. Boardman)
Gateway to Tomorrow (1954)
The Best From New Worlds Science Fiction (1955)
Gateway to the Stars (1955)
Lambda 1 & Other Stories (1964)
New Writings in SF Anthology series, parts 1–21 - edited from 1964 to 1972
Weird Shadows From Beyond (1965)

References

External links

Carnell GoH at 1949 Worldcon

1912 births
1972 deaths
British magazine editors
Science fiction editors
British speculative fiction editors